Sebastian Korda (born July 5, 2000) is an American professional tennis player. Korda's career-high ATP singles ranking of world No. 26 was achieved on 30 January 2023. He has won one ATP singles tournament, the 2021 Emilia-Romagna Open. He also won the junior title at the 2018 Australian Open, 20 years after his father Petr Korda won the Australian Open title.

Early life and background
Sebastian Korda is the son of two Czech tennis players, former men's world number two Petr Korda and former top 30 women's player Regina Rajchrtová. His father was an Australian Open champion and French Open finalist in both singles and doubles. Sebastian's older sisters Jessica and Nelly are both LPGA golf professionals. Korda grew up playing competitive junior ice hockey from the age of 3, but decided to switch to tennis at the age of 9 after accompanying his father to the 2009 US Open. At age 11, he won a golf tournament in Prague, in which his sister Nelly also competed.

Professional career

2018: ATP debut
Korda made his ATP main draw debut at the New York Open. As a wildcard entry, he lost in the first round to Frances Tiafoe in three sets.

2020: Major debut & fourth round at French Open 
Korda made his Masters 1000 debut as a qualifier at the warm-up Western & Southern Open tournament prior to the US Open. Korda made his Grand Slam debut as a wildcard at the US Open where he was defeated by Denis Shapovalov.

As a qualifier, Korda reached the fourth round at the French Open after beating Andreas Seppi, 21st seed John Isner and fellow qualifier Pedro Martínez. He lost to defending (and eventual) champion Rafael Nadal in straight sets.

2021: First ATP title, Wimbledon fourth round, top 40

Korda reached his first ATP final at the Delray Beach Open defeating Cameron Norrie. He lost to Hubert Hurkacz in straight sets.

Korda made another breakthrough run at the Miami Masters, where he reached his first Masters 1000 quarterfinal. He beat 10th seed Fabio Fognini in three sets, 17th seed Aslan Karatsev in straight sets and scored his first top 10 win against Diego Schwartzman in three sets. He lost to 4th seed Andrey Rublev in the quarterfinals. He also reached a then career-high ranking of ATP world No. 62 on April 12, 2021.

In May, Korda lifted his first career ATP Tour singles title at the Emilia-Romagna Open, an ATP 250 tournament first played in 2021 due to the one-week delay of the 2021 French Open. He beat Marco Cecchinato in the final and did not drop a set throughout the tournament. He also became the first American male tennis player to win on European clay since Sam Querrey in 2010. As a result of this successful run, he reached a new then career-high of No. 50 on May 31, 2021.

In June at the Halle Open, his first ever ATP event on grass, Korda picked up his second top 10 win against 6th seed Roberto Bautista Agut along with beating Kei Nishikori en route to the quarterfinals, where he lost to eventual champion Ugo Humbert.

A week later, in his debut at the Wimbledon Championships, Korda reached the fourth round for the first time in his career after defeating in-form player and 15th seed Alex de Minaur, qualifier Antoine Hoang, and 22nd seed Dan Evans. However, he lost in the fourth round to 25th seed Karen Khachanov in five tight sets with the score in the fifth set being 10–8 after thirteen breaks of serve. Despite the loss, he reached a new career-high ranking of No. 46 on July 12, 2021.

At the Rolex Paris Masters, Korda defeated 13th seed Aslan Karatsev and former world No. 3 Marin Čilić. The win over Karatsev ended the Russian's push to qualify for the season-ending ATP Finals.

2022: Australian Open & three Masters third rounds, top 30
In his debut at the Australian Open he recorded his first victory by defeating 12th seed Cameron Norrie. He went on to defeat Corentin Moutet in the second round in a tight five set match with a super tiebreak in the fifth set to reach the third round for the first time at this Major. At the 2022 Delray Beach Open, Norrie defeated Korda in the quarterfinals.

Korda entered the 2022 Indian Wells Masters in March. After beating Thanasi Kokkinakis in the first round, Korda faced Rafael Nadal in the second and, despite serving a breadstick in the second set and leading 5–2 in the final set, he lost in a tiebreak. At the 2022 Miami Open, Korda defeated Alejandro Davidovich Fokina and Albert Ramos Viñolas in the first two rounds before being knocked out by Miomir Kecmanović in the third round.

At the 2022 Monte-Carlo Masters he defeated recent Miami Open champion Carlos Alcaraz for the biggest win of his season to reach the third round. He gained revenge for his defeat to Alcaraz at the 2021 Next Generation ATP Finals.

He reached the semifinals at the 2022 Estoril Open, defeating top seed and World No. 10 Félix Auger-Aliassime, avenging a 2021 Acapulco loss, for his third top-10 win. As a result, he reached the top 30 in the rankings on 2 May 2022.

At the 2022 US Open, he reached the second round for the first time at this Major after defeating Facundo Bagnis before losing in a five sets, all-American clash with Tommy Paul.

At the 2022 Gijón Open he reached the third final of his career defeating en route third seed Roberto Bautista Agut, Andy Murray in the quarterfinals and Arthur Rinderknech in the semifinals. He lost to top seed Andrey Rublev in straight sets. He followed it by a fourth final at the 2022 European Open in Antwerp defeating Dominic Thiem before losing to second seed Félix Auger-Aliassime.

2023: Fifth ATP final, First Major quarterfinal
He reached his fifth ATP final at the 2023 Adelaide International 1, where he lost to top seed Novak Djokovic in three sets despite having a championship point.

He reached the quarterfinals of a Major for the first time in his career at the 2023 Australian Open after defeating tenth seed Hubert Hurkacz in five sets.

Performance timeline

Singles
Current through the 2023 Australian Open.

ATP Tour career finals

Singles: 5 (1 title, 4 runner-ups)

ATP Next Generation finals

Singles: 1 (1 runner-up)

ATP Challenger and ITF Futures finals

Singles: 10 (2–8)

Doubles: 6 (2–4)

Junior Grand Slam finals

Singles: 1 (1 title)

Record against other players

Record against top 10 players
Korda's record against players who have been ranked in the top 10, with those who are active in boldface. Only ATP Tour main draw matches are considered:

Wins over top 10 players
Korda has a  record against players who were, at the time the match was played, ranked in the top 10.

References

External links
 
 

2000 births
Living people
American male tennis players
Sportspeople from Bradenton, Florida
Australian Open (tennis) junior champions
American people of Czech descent
Tennis people from Florida
Grand Slam (tennis) champions in boys' singles